Ian Burnley (born 11 March 1963) is an English cricketer. He played three first-class matches for Cambridge University Cricket Club in 1984.

See also
 List of Cambridge University Cricket Club players

References

External links
 

1963 births
Living people
English cricketers
Cambridge University cricketers
Sportspeople from Darlington
Cricketers from County Durham